This is a list of members of the South Australian Legislative Council between 2018 and 2022. As half of the Legislative Council's terms expired at each state election, half of these members were elected at the 2014 state election with terms expiring in 2022, while the other half were elected at the 2018 state election with terms expiring in 2026.

 Australian Conservatives MLC Dennis Hood, who had been elected as a Family First Party MLC in 2014, defected to the Liberal Party nine days after the 2018 state election.
 Liberal MLC Andrew McLachlan resigned on 6 February 2020 to take up an appointment to the Australian Senate. Nicola Centofanti was appointed to replace him on 7 April 2020.
 Liberal MLC John Dawkins was expelled from the Liberal Party in 2020 after successfully running against the party's nominee for Legislative Council President. This was against the party's rules.
 Greens MLC Mark Parnell resigned on 1 April 2021. Robert Simms was appointed to replace him on 4 May 2021.
 Liberal MLC David Ridgway resigned on 30 June 2021. Heidi Girolamo was appointed to replace him on 24 August 2021.

See also
 Members of the South Australian House of Assembly, 2018–2022

Members of South Australian parliaments by term
21st-century Australian politicians